Swartkops is a village in Nelson Mandela Bay in the Eastern Cape province of South Africa.

The location is on the Swartkops River, 11 km north of Port Elizabeth and 1,6 km from the Indian Ocean. Swartkops means "black hills" in Afrikaans, and the name is said to refer to surrounding hillocks crested with dark shadows.

A railway junction was built here by the Cape Government Railways in 1872, to service the lines being constructed to Makhanda and Alicedale in the east, Port Elizabeth to the south, and Uitenhage to the west.

Transport

Roads 

The main artery of Swartkops is the R102 “Grahamstown Road” which connects the village to Deal Party and Port Elizabeth in the south and Motherwell and Markman in the north. 

Swartkops also has access to two metropolitan routes within Nelson Mandela Bay including the M17 (Dibanisa Road; to Ibhayi and Markman) and M19 (Trunk Road; to Redhouse, Perserverance, Despatch and Uitenhage)

References

Populated places in Nelson Mandela Bay